James K. Beattie is an Australian chemist from University of Sydney and an Elected Fellow of the American Association for the Advancement of Science and Royal Society of Chemistry.

References

Academic staff of the University of Sydney
Australian chemists
Fellows of the Royal Society
Living people
Year of birth missing (living people)